Joseph Farrell (born February 13, 1994) is an American soccer player who currently plays for Pittsburgh Riverhounds SC of the USL Championship.

Career

College and amateur
Farrell played fours years of college soccer at the La Salle University between 2012 and 2015.

Farrell also played with New York Red Bulls U-23 in 2014 to 2015.

Professional
Farrell signed his first professional deal with United Soccer League club Rochester Rhinos on March 8, 2016.

Farrell signed with Phoenix Rising FC for the 2018 season on December 18, 2017.

Farrell was transferred to the Pittsburgh Riverhounds on December 29, 2022.

Honors

Individual
 USL All-League Second Team: 2016

References

1994 births
Living people
American soccer players
Association football defenders
La Salle Explorers men's soccer players
National Premier Soccer League players
New York Red Bulls U-23 players
People from Whitpain Township, Pennsylvania
Phoenix Rising FC players
Pittsburgh Riverhounds SC players
Rochester New York FC players
Soccer players from Pennsylvania
Sportspeople from Montgomery County, Pennsylvania
USL Championship players
USL League Two players